Pierre Valde, real name Pierre Duchemin, (25 November 1907 -  26 February 1977) was a French stage actor and theatre director. Ha was a dramaturge at the Théâtre de l'Atelier managed by Charles Dullin from 1933 to 1937 then established his own company, the Théâtre du Temps which was awarded the first prize of young companies for Œdipe by Georges Sonnier.

Filmography 
 1969 :  by René Lucot, episode: Maigret in Exile, as the judge Forlacroix
 1976 : Les Mystères de Loudun by Gérard Vergez, as Laubardemont
 1977 : 
 1977 : La Question by Laurent Heynemann, as the assassinated president
 1977 : Bergeval père et fils, as Leversin
 1977 : Spoiled Children by Bertrand Tavernier
 1977 : Les Enquêtes du commissaire Maigret, épisode :  by Marcel Cravenne

Theatre

Comedian 
 1943 : The Imaginary Invalid by Molière, mise en scène Pierre Valde, Théâtre du Temps 
 1947 : Les Amants de Noël by Pierre Barillet, mise en scène Pierre Valde, Théâtre de Poche Montparnasse
 1948 : La Dame de l'aube by Alejandro Casona, mise en scène Pierre Valde, Théâtre de la Gaîté-Montparnasse
 1950 : Le Cid by Corneille, mise en scène Jean Vilar, Festival d'Avignon 
 1952 : Jésus la Caille, adapted from the novel Jésus-la-Caille by Francis Carco, mise en scène Pierre Valde, Théâtre des Célestins, Théâtre Gramont, Théâtre Antoine
 1958 : The Anniversary by John Whiting, mise en scène Pierre Valde, Théâtre du Vieux-Colombier 
 1959 : La Cathédrale by René Aubert, mise en scène Pierre Valde, Théâtre Hébertot
 1959 : Les Petits Bourgeois by Maxim Gorky, mise en scène Grégory Chmara, Théâtre de l'Œuvre
 1966 : An Enemy of the People by Henrik Ibsen, mise en scène Pierre Valde, Théâtre de Colombes
 1967 : Vassa Geleznova by Maxim Gorky, mise en scène Pierre Valde, Théâtre de Colombes
 1967 : L'Unique Jour de l'année by Alan Seymour, mise en scène Pierre Valde, Théâtre de Colombes
 1967 : Le Cid by Corneille, mise en scène Pierre Valde, Théâtre de Colombes
 1968 : The Imaginary Invalid by Molière, mise en scène Pierre Valde, Théâtre de Colombes
 1968 : L'étoile devient rouge by Seán O'Casey, mise en scène Pierre Valde, Théâtre de Colombes
 1969 : A Marriage Proposal by Anton Chekov, mise en scène Christian Dente, Théâtre de Colombes
 1969 : Peace by Pierre Valde and Yves Carlevaris after Aristophanes, mise en scène Pierre Valde, Théâtre de Colombes 
 1969 : Le Barbier de Séville by Beaumarchais, mise en scène Pierre Valde, Théâtre de Colombes
 1969 : Le Médecin malgré lui by Molière, mise en scène Pierre Valde, Théâtre de Colombes

Theatre director 

 1943 : The Imaginary Invalid by Molière
 1944 : Hyménée by Nikolai Gogol, Théâtre du Vieux-Colombier
 1946 : Œdipe by Georges Sonnier
 1946 : La Pomme rouge by René Aubert, Théâtre de Poche Montparnasse 
 1947 : Les Amants de Noël by Pierre Barillet, Théâtre de Poche
 1947 : Les Enfants du Bon Dieu by Jean-Marie Dunoyer, Théâtre de Poche 
 1947 : Le Testament du Père Leleu by Roger Martin du Gard, Théâtre de Poche
 1948 : La Dame de l'aube by Alejandro Casona, Théâtre de la Gaîté-Montparnasse
 1948 : Dirty Hands by Jean-Paul Sartre, Théâtre Antoine
 1949 : An Inspector Calls by John Boynton Priestley, Studio des Champs-Élysées
 1950 : La Grande Pauline et les Petits Chinois by René Aubert, Théâtre de l'Étoile
 1951 : Les Radis creux by Jean Meckert, Théâtre de Poche Montparnasse
 1952 : Jésus la Caille by Francis Carco, Théâtre des Célestins, Théâtre Gramont, Théâtre Antoine
 1953 : Crime on Goat-Island by Ugo Betti, Théâtre des Noctambules
 1953 : The Rose Tattoo by Tennessee Williams, Théâtre Gramont 
 1953 : Anadyomène by Georges Clément, Théâtre de l'Apollo
 1954 : Affaire vous concernant by Jean-Pierre Conty, Théâtre de Paris
 1954 : La Maison carrée by Évelyne Pollet, Théâtre des Noctambules
 1955 : Poppi by Georges Sonnier, Théâtre des Arts 
 1955 : The Witness for the Prosecution by Agatha Christie, Théâtre Édouard VII
 1955 : Judas by Marcel Pagnol, Théâtre de Paris
 1956 : L’Orgueil et la nuée by Georges Soria, Théâtre des Noctambules 
 1957 : Bettina by Alfred Fabre-Luce, Théâtre de l'Œuvre
 1957 : Cléo de Paris, Théâtre de l'Œuvre
 1958 : The anniversary by John Whiting, Théâtre du Vieux-Colombier
 1958 : L'Enfant du dimanche by Pierre Brasseur, Théâtre Édouard VII
 1959 : La Cathédrale by René Aubert, Théâtre Hébertot
 1960 : L'Enfant de la route by Isabelle Georges Schreiber, Théâtre de l'Œuvre
 1960 : Ana d'Eboli by Pierre Ordioni, Théâtre Charles de Rochefort
 1960 : La Logeuse by Jacques Audiberti, Théâtre de l'Œuvre
 1961 : Amal et la lettre du roi by Rabindranath Tagore, Théâtre de l'Œuvre
 1963 : L'assassin est dans la salle by Pierre Nimus, Théâtre des Arts
 1963 : A Month in the Country by Ivan Turgenev, Théâtre du Capitole de Toulouse
 1964 : La Peau du carnassier by Victor Haïm, Comédie de Paris
 1966 : The Rose Tattoo by Tennessee Williams, Théâtre municipal de Lausanne
 1966 : An Enemy of the People by Henrik Ibsen, Théâtre de Colombes
 1966 : Mourir en chantant by Victor Haïm, Théâtre de Colombes
 1967 : La Dévotion à la croix after Pedro Calderón de la Barca, adaptation Albert Camus, Grand Théâtre de Limoges
 1967 : The Miser by Molière, Théâtre de Colombes
 1967 : Mort d'une baleine by Jacques Jacquine, Comédie de Paris
 1967 : L'Unique Jour de l'année by Alan Seymour, Théâtre de Colombes
 1967 : Le Cid by Corneille, Théâtre de Colombes
 1967 : Vassa Geleznova by Maxim Gorky, Théâtre de Colombes
 1968 : The Imaginary Invalid by Molière, Théâtre de Colombes
 1968 : The Star Turns Red by Seán O'Casey, Théâtre de Colombes
 1968 : Tartuffe by Molière, Théâtre de Colombes
 1969 : Peace by Pierre Valde and Yves Carlevaris after Aristophanes, Théâtre de Colombes 
 1969 : Le Mariage de Barillon by Georges Feydeau
 1969 : Le Barbier de Séville by Beaumarchais, Théâtre de Colombes
 1969 : Le Médecin malgré lui by Molière, Théâtre de Colombes
 1970 : Britannicus by Racine, Théâtre de Colombes

External links 
 
 Notice-biographie: Pierre Valde sur Les Gens du Cinéma
 Les Archives du Spectacle

French male stage actors
French male film actors
French theatre directors
People from Haute-Loire
1907 births
1977 deaths